Sylheti is an Indo-Aryan language spoken by an estimated 11 million people, primarily in the Sylhet Division of Bangladesh and in parts of Northeast India. Besides, there are substantial numbers of Sylheti speakers within diaspora communities in the United Kingdom, the United States, Canada and the Middle East.

It is variously perceived as either a dialect of Bengali or a language in its own right. While most linguists consider it an independent language, for many native speakers Sylheti forms the diglossic vernacular, with standard Bengali forming the codified lect. Some incorrectly consider it as a "corrupt" form of Bengali, and there is a reported language shift from Sylheti to Standard Bengali in Bangladesh, India and the diaspora; though Sylheti has more vitality than Standard Bengali in the United Kingdom.

Name

Sylheti is eponymously named after Sylhet, referring to the dialect or language spoken of that area. According to  the vernacular was called Sylhettia by the Europeans after the town of Sylhet. Though the speakers at that time referred to it as Jaintiapuri, Purba Srihattiya, or Ujania with the latter meaning "the language of the upper country".

Sylheti is also known as Sylhetti, Sylheti Bangla, Sileti, Siloti, Syloti, and Syloty.

History
Sylheti belongs to the Eastern Indo-Aryan languages, that evolved from Magadhi Prakrit. The lowlands around Sylhet were originally inhabited by ancient Khasi people (Austroasiatic); and the earliest known Indo-Aryan settlements were made in the 6th century under Kamarupa king.  Sylhet (Srihatta) then emerged as a center of lowland territorialism after the 10th century.  The 11th century Bhatera grants from the Srihatta kings Kesavadeva and Isanadeva were written in Sanskrit.  Another notable copper plate inscription was found in the village of Paschimbhag in Rajnagar, Moulvibazar that was issued by King Srichandra during the 10th century.

The Muslim Conquest of Sylhet in 1303 CE extended the migratory movements of Muslims from western lands, who settled among the native population and greatly influenced the local language. Thus Sylheti derived a large number of words from Persian and Arabic, cultivating the Perso-Arabic influence on the vernacular. A script was developed in the region called Sylheti Nagri, which primarily focused on disseminating Sufi poetry, known as puthi. Its earliest known work had been written during the 1600s, called Bhedsar by Syed Shah Husayn Alam. The literature was transcribed in the standard form of late Middle Bengali, though its phonology and some of its vocabulary was strongly influenced by Sylheti. The script was read and taught culturally among households and was not institutionalised, as the Islamic dynasties who ruled over Bengal established Persian alongside Arabic as the official languages. Printed texts of the script reached its peak during the late 19th century, however its use became obsolete by around the middle of the 20th century.

The earliest appearance of a documentation of Sylheti vocabulary was in the Government Report on the History and Statistics of Sylhet District by T. Walton, B.C.S. in 1857, which contained a list of peculiar words used in Sylhet. Many terms that were listed here differ from modern Sylheti – highlighting its evolution. In 1868, another short glossary of local terms in various districts of the Dacca Division (which included Sylhet) were written up and compared to standard Bengali to allow ease in understanding local vernaculars. There was an influence of the Assamese language on Sylheti when Sylhet was separated from Bengal and became part of the Assam Province, British India in 1874. This however led to an opposition in Sylhet where demands to be reincorporated with the Bengal Province were not taken heed of by the British. Sylhetis not only felt a historical or cultural affinity with Bengal, but also linguistically. Bengali literature had some influence from Sylheti, popular songwriters or poets such as Hason Raja or Shah Abdul Karim, significantly contributed to the literature. Sylhet was reunited with Bengal following a referendum in 1947.

Status
According to Simard, Dopierala and Thaut, Sylheti is a "minoritised, politically unrecognised, and understudied language." It is currently not officially recognised as a language in either Bangladesh or India. Many native speakers too consider it to be an informal version of Standard Bengali and not an independent language; and there is a reported language shift to Standard Bengali and a decrease in the number of native speakers since parents are not teaching it to their children. In Bangladesh there is a diglossia where Sylheti is one among other low status regional dialects while Standard Bengali, the official language, has a high status.

In the Indian state of Assam where Assamese is the state language, Standard Bengali language serves as an additional official language in its Barak Valley districts; which host a majority Sylheti-speaking population.

In the United Kingdom, British schools have begun enlisting Sylheti in their syllabi. BBC News has also broadcast online videos relating to COVID-19 in five major South Asian languages including Sylheti.

Classification

 notes that the language of eastern Sylhet is not intelligible to Bengalis from the west, though he still classed it as Bengali, grouping it under "Eastern Bengali".  too calls it a dialect of Bengali and places it in the eastern Vangiya group of Magadhi Prakrit and notes that all Bengali dialects were independent of each other and did not emanate from the literary Bengali called "sadhu bhasha". Among the different dialect groups of the eastern dialects, to which Sylheti belonged, Sylheti and Chittagonian have phonetic and morphological properties that are alien to standard Bengali and other western dialects of Bengali, and these differences are such that Sylheti is more distant to standard Bengali than is Assamese. Recent scholarship notes that these morpho-phonological and mutual intelligibility differences are significant enough that Sylheti could claim itself as a language on its own right. Ethnologue groups Sylheti in Bengali–Assamese languages; whereas Glotolog gives further subgrouping and places it in the "Eastern Bengali" group alongside Hajong, separately from the Vangiya dialect.

Language-dialect controversy 
The classification of Sylheti is contentious—Chalmers (1996) suggested that it was generally identified as a dialect of Bengali though there were efforts to recognise it as a language. Anecdotal evidence suggests that Sylhetis, who could also speak in Standard Bengali, considered the two languages to be mutually intelligible. On the basis of the anecdotal evidence of mutual intelligibility, regionality and the fact that Sylheti is spoken by a predominantly rural community,  concludes that Sylheti could be considered a dialect of Bengali. Simard, Dopierala and Thaut have pointed out that the intelligibility could be an effect of prior exposure of Sylheti speakers to Standard Bengali, and that the academic consensus is that mutual intelligibility ranges from "unintelligible" to "hardly intelligible". On the basis of phonology and phonetics, lexicon, grammatical structure and a lack of mutual intelligibility, some recent linguists claim that Sylheti is not merely a dialectal variation of Bengali but a language in its own right.

Phonologically Sylheti is distinguished from Standard Bengali and other regional varieties by significant deaspiration and spirantisation, leading to major restructuring of the consonant inventory and the development of tones. Grierson had classified Sylheti as an Eastern Bengali dialect and had noted that it "possess all the peculiar characteristics of the extreme Eastern Bengali type."

As majority of the diaspora in the United Kingdom speak Sylheti, it created an environment that was somewhat uninfluenced by Standard Bengali, inevitably leading some to view Sylheti as a distinct language.  During the 1980s there were unsuccessful attempts to recognise Sylheti as a language in its own right by a small group in the London borough of Tower Hamlets, which lacked support from the Sylheti community itself.

Literature
Halat-un-Nabi, a puthi written by Sadeq Ali is considered to be the most prominent literature in Sylheti Nagri. 

The presence and influence of Shah Jalal and Shri Chaitanya dev is found in the Sylheti literature. According to Syed Mostafa Kamal, (approximately 1650 AD) the Baul tradition was founded based on the combination of Chaitanyavad and Jaganmohani ideologies, that mystic literature influenced and seen in the Vaishnava Padavali. As a result, Sylhet is considered as the spiritual capital of mysticism and the fertile land of Baul music. A great number of poets enriched Sylheti literature. Among them, Hason Raja, Radha Raman, Syed Shah Noor, Shitalong Shaha, Durbin Shaha are noteworthy. The main theme of the Nagri literature are mainly religious, Islamic history, tradition, stories and Raga, Baul and mystic music. 140 books have been found including 88 printed books (in Nagri script).

Geographical distribution

Sylheti is the primary language of Sylhet region which today comprises the Sylhet Division of Bangladesh and Karimganj district of Assam, India. Within the Sylhet Division, it is primarily spoken in the districts of Sylhet and Moulvibazar, as well as in certain upazilas of Sunamganj and Habiganj. This is contrary to popular belief that Sylheti is spoken everywhere in the Sylhet Division. Anecdotal evidence claims that the people of Sylhet District, when visiting places like Habiganj, are often startled that the locals do not converse in Sylheti but rather in Habiganji, which is transitional to the dialects of Sylhet, Greater Mymensingh and Brahmanbaria.

It is also primarily spoken in the districts of Cachar and Hailakandi of Assam, which alongside Karimganj make up the Barak Valley, as well as in the northern parts of Tripura and the western edge of Manipur. There is also a significant population of Sylheti speakers in the Hojai district of Assam (since before Partition), Shillong in Meghalaya, and the state of Nagaland. A few numbers are also located in Kolkata, most of whom are migrants from Assam.

Outside the Indian subcontinent, the largest Sylheti diaspora communities reside in the United Kingdom and North America. In the UK, there are around 400,000 Sylheti speakers. The largest concentration live in east London boroughs, such as Tower Hamlets. In the United States, most are concentrated in New York City borough's such as the Bronx, and there are significant numbers in Hamtramck, Michigan where they constitute the majority of Bangladeshis in the city. There are also small numbers located in Toronto, Canada. Significant Sylheti-speaking communities reside in the Middle East of which most are migrant workers, and in many other countries throughout the world.

Writing system
Sylheti currently does not have a standardised writing system. Historically in the Sylhet region, the Sylheti Nagri script was used alongside the Bengali script. Sylheti Nagri was however mostly limited to writing religious poetry. This written form was identical to those written in the Dobhashi register due to both lacking the use of tatsama and using Perso-Arabic vocabulary as a replacement. As per Dobhashi custom, many Sylheti Nagri texts were paginated from right to left. The orthography of the script equates with Sylheti, it has fewer characters as compared with the Bengali script due to fewer phonemes found in Sylheti. An endangered script, it has since seen a revival mostly by academics and linguists.

Standard Bengali is the medium of instruction in Bangladesh. some may therefore write in Sylheti using the Bengali–Assamese script. In United Kingdom, publishers use Latin script for Sylheti and according to the Sylheti Translation and Research (STAR), Latin (Roman) script is the most used script for writing Sylheti. New Testament in Sylheti was published in the Sylhet Nagri script along with Latin and Bengali–Assamese script, in 2014.

Lexicon
Sylheti shares most linguistic properties with Standard Bengali, with a lexical similarity of 70%.

Phonology
The phoneme inventory of Sylheti differs from both the Standard Bengali as well the Bangladeshi Standard. It is characterised by a loss of breathiness and aspiration contrasts, leading to a significant reduction in its phoneme inventory and development of tones.  In particular the following developments are seen:
 Both voiced and voiceless aspirated stops have become unaspirated ( → ;  → ).
 The voiceless labials have spirantised to homorganic fricatives ( → ;  → ).
 The velar stops have become velar fricatives ( → ;  → ), although  can be heard as an allophone of  when preceded by high vowels .
 The post-alveolar affricates have spirantised to alveolar fricatives ( → ;  → ;  → ;  → ).
 Among the voiceless stops only the dental /, / and retroflex /, / stops have remained stops. In some analyses, the dental–retroflex distinction (/, /) is replaced by highly unusual dental–alveolar one (/, /), although this source appears to contradictorily merge these previous stops into a single stop (//).

Tone
Sylheti is tonal. This is rare among the Indo-Aryan languages, but not unheard of, e.g., in Punjabi, Dogri, Gawri (Kalam Kohistani), Torwali, some Eastern Bengali varieties, etc. There are two types of tonal contrasts in Sylheti: the emergence of high tone in the vowels following the loss of aspiration, and a level tone elsewhere.

Recent study shows that there is a three-way tonal system in Sylheti.

It is considered that these tones arose when aspirated consonants lost their aspiration. Sylheti continues to have a long history of coexisting with tonal Tibeto-Burman languages such as various dialects of Kokborok, Reang. Even though there is no clear evidence of direct borrowing of lexical items from those languages into Sylheti, there is still a possibility that the emergence of Sylheti tones is due to external influence, as the indigenous speakers of Tibeto-Burman languages by and large use Sylheti as a common medium for interaction.

Grammar
Sylheti grammar is the study of the morphology and syntax of Sylheti.

Nouns

Case
When a definite article such as -gu/ţa (singular) or -guin/ţin (plural) is added, nouns are also inflected for number. Below are two tables which show the inflections of an animate noun,   ('student'), and an inanimate noun,   ('shoe').

All of the inflected nouns above have an indefinite article preceding their case markers. There are some basic rules to keep in mind about the cases, apart from the "default" nominative.

For the genitive case, the ending may change, though never with a definite article attached. A noun (without an article) which ends in a consonant or the inherent vowel,  ô, is inflected by adding  -ôr to the end of the word (and deleting the inherent vowel if applicable). An example of this would be the genitive of  gus 'meat' being  gustôr 'of meat' or '(the) meat's'. A noun which ends in any vowel apart from the inherent vowel will just have a  -r following it, as in the genitive of  fua being  fuar '(the) boy's'. The genitive ending is also applied to verbs (in their verbal noun forms), which is most commonly seen when using postpositions (for example:  hikar lagi, 'for learning').

For the locative case, the marker also changes in a similar fashion to the genitive case, with consonants and the inherent vowel having their own ending,  -ô, and all other vowels having another ending,  -t. For example,  silôţô 'in Sylhet',  dáxát 'in Dhaka', etc.

Measure words
When counted, nouns must also be accompanied by the appropriate measure word. The noun's measure word (MW) must be used in between the numeral and the noun. Most nouns take the generic measure word gu/ţa/xán, although there are many more specific measure words, such as zôn, which is only used to count humans.

Measuring nouns in Sylheti without their corresponding measure words (e.g. aţ mekur instead of aţ-ţa mekur 'eight cats') would typically be considered ungrammatical. However, omitting the noun and preserving the measure word is grammatical and not uncommon to hear. For example, Xáli êx-zôn táxbô. (lit. 'Only one-MW will remain.') would be understood to mean 'Only one person will remain.', since zôn can only be used to count humans.

Pronouns

Personal pronouns 
Sylheti personal pronouns are somewhat similar to English pronouns, having different words for first, second, and third person, and also for singular and plural (unlike for verbs, below). Sylheti pronouns, like their English counterparts, do differentiate for gender. Sylheti has different third-person pronouns for proximity. The first are used for someone who is nearby, and the second are for those who are a little further away. The third are usually for those who are not present. In addition, each of the second- and third-person pronouns have different forms for the familiar and polite forms; the second person also has a "very familiar" form (sometimes called "despective"). It may be noted that the "very familiar" form is used when addressing particularly close friends or family as well as for addressing subordinates, or in abusive language. In the following tables, the abbreviations used are as follows: VF=very familiar, F=familiar, and P=polite (honor); H=here, T=there, E=elsewhere (proximity), and I=inanimate.

The nominative case is used for pronouns that are the subject of the sentence, such as "I already did that" or "Will you please stop making that noise?"

The objective case is used for pronouns serving as the direct or indirect objects, such as "I told him to wash the dishes" or "The teacher gave me the homework assignment". The inanimate pronouns remain the same in the objective case.

The possessive case is used to show possession, such as "Where is your coat?" or "Let's go to our house". In addition, sentences such as "I have a book" or "I need money" also use the possessive (the literal translation of the Bengali versions of these sentences would be "There is my book" and "There is my need for money" respectively).

Indefinite and negative pronouns 
Bengali has no negative pronouns (such as no one, nothing, none). These are typically represented by adding the negative particle  (nae) to indefinite pronouns, which are themselves derived from their corresponding question words. Common indefinite pronouns are listed below.

Relative pronouns 
The relative pronoun  (ze) and its different variants, as shown below, are commonly employed in complex sentences. The relative pronouns for animate objects change for number and honour, but those for inanimate objects stay the same.

Adjectives 
Adjectives do not inflect for case, gender, or number in Sylheti and are placed before the noun they modify.

Comparatives and superlatives 
The word for more is optional, but the word for less is required, so in its absence more is inferred.

Verbs
Sylheti verbs are highly inflected and are regular with only few exceptions. They consist of a stem and an ending; they are traditionally listed in Sylheti dictionaries in their "verbal noun" form, which is usually formed by adding -a to the stem: for instance,  (xôra, to do) is formed from the stem . The stem can end in either a vowel or a consonant. Verbs are conjugated for tense and person by changing the endings, which are largely the same for all verbs. However, the stem vowel can often change as part of the phenomenon known as vowel harmony, whereby one vowel can be influenced by other vowels in the word to sound more harmonious. An example would be the verb to write, with stem lex-:  (lexô, 'you all write') but also  (lekí, 'we write'). If verbs are classified by stem vowel and if the stem ends in a consonant or vowel, there are nine basic classes in which most verbs can be placed; all verbs in a class will follow the same pattern. A prototype verb from each of these classes will be used to demonstrate conjugation for that class; bold will be used to indicate mutation of the stem vowel.

Like many other Indo-Aryan languages (such as Standard Bengali or Assamese), nouns can be turned into verbs by combining them with select auxiliary verbs. When conjugating such verbs the noun part of such a verb is left untouched, so in the previous example, only  would be inflected or conjugated (e.g.: I will make a joke becomes ; see more on tenses below).

 Copula 
Sylheti is considered a zero copula language in some aspects.
 In the simple present tense there is no verb connecting the subject to the predicative (the "zero verb" copula). There is one notable exception, however, which is when the predicative takes on the existential, locative, or possessive aspects; for such purposes, the incomplete verb  (as) is used, which is conjugated according to the rules given below.
 In the past tense, the incomplete verb  is always used as the copula, regardless of the nature of the predicative.
 For the future tense and non-finite structures, the copula is supplied by the verb  (ówa), with the only exception being the possessive predicative for which the verb  (táxa, 'to remain') is utilised.

The following table demonstrates the rules above with some examples.

 Negation 
There are three sentence negators employed in Sylheti:
 All other verbs (with the exceptions of the ones listed above) are negated using the universal negative particle  (nae).  is typically placed after the finite verb (see examples below), but can also be placed at the end of the sentence, which negates the whole sentence.  can be used in all tenses except two: the present perfect and the past perfect.
 Verbs in the present perfect and the past perfect tenses are negated using the suffix  (na) which can also refer to "no" in yes-no questions.

Person
Verbs are inflected for person and honour, but not for number. There are five forms: first person, second person (very familiar), second person (familiar), third person (familiar), and second/third person (polite).

Comparison

Comparison with Standard Bengali
A phrase in:
Standard Bengali:  .
Sylheti: / ex deshôr gail arôx deshôr mát.

which literally means 'one land's obscenity is another land's language', and can be roughly translated to convey that a similar word in one language can mean something very different in another.

Another example:

   in Standard Bengali means 'cloud'.
   in Eastern Bengali means 'rain' or 'cloud'.
 /মেঘ megh in Sylheti means 'rain'.
 In Pali, मेघ megha'' means both 'rain' and 'cloud'.

See also
Bengali–Assamese languages
Languages of India
Languages of Bangladesh
Tibeto-Burman languages
Barman language
Meitei language

References

Bibliography

Notes

External links

Bengali dialects
Eastern Indo-Aryan languages
Languages of Bangladesh
Languages of Assam
Sylheti language
Tonal languages in non-tonal families